Padilla is a surname of Spanish origin. Notable people in various countries are listed herein.

Bolivia
 David Padilla (1927–2016), former president of Bolivia

Colombia
 José Prudencio Padilla (1784–1828), Colombian military leader

Cuba
 Heberto Padilla (1932–2000), Cuban poet

France

Greenland
 Maligiaq Padilla (born 1982), Greenlandic kayaker

Honduras
 Carlos Padilla Velásquez (1932–2014), Honduran footballer and manager

Mexico
 Aarón Padilla (born 1977), Mexican footballer
 Ariel López Padilla (born 1962), Mexican actor
 Ignacio Padilla (1968–2016), Mexican writer

Nicaragua
 Vicente Padilla (born 1977), former Nicaraguan Major League Baseball pitcher

Philippines
 Bela Padilla (born 1991), Filipino actress
 Daniel Padilla (born 1995), Filipino actor
 Kylie Padilla (born 1993), Filipino actress
 Robin Padilla (born 1969), Filipino actor
 Nathaniel Padilla, Filipino sports shooter
 Zsa Zsa Padilla (born 1964), Filipino singer and actress

Puerto Rico
 Alejandro García Padilla (born 1971), Puerto Rican politician and attorney
Trinidad "Trina" Padilla de Sanz (1894-1957), Writer, storyteller, poet

Spain
 Blanca Padilla (born 1995), Spanish fashion Model
 Jesús Padilla Gálvez (born 1959), Spanish philosopher 
 José Padilla (Sánchez) (1889–1960), Spanish composer
 Juan Gutiérrez de Padilla (c.1590–1664), Spanish composer who lived in what is now Mexico
 Martín de Padilla y Manrique, 1st Count of Santa Gadea

United States
 Aaron Padilla (artist) (born 1974), American artist and art educator 
 Alex Padilla (born 1973), California Secretary of State and U.S. Senator
 Anthony Padilla (born 1987), American comedian and actor, and former member of the group Smosh
 Craig Padilla, American ambient musician and film score composer, actor, and video producer
 Ernesto Padilla (born 1972), Cuban-American artist and cigarmaker
 Frederick M. Padilla (born 1959), 15th president of the National Defense University
 José Padilla (prisoner) (born 1970), U.S. citizen held as enemy combatant and later convicted of having aided terrorists
 Leonard Padilla (born 1939), American bounty hunter
 Mike Padilla, American politician
 Nicholas Padilla (born 1996), American baseball player
 Vicente Padilla (born 1977), former Nicaraguan Major League Baseball pitcher
 Alex Padilla (American football) (born 2001), American football player

Fictional Characters
 Antonio “Tony” Padilla, a character in the novel and Netflix series, 13 Reasons Why

See also
Padilha, the Portuguese-language variant

Spanish-language surnames